Leopold Adametz (11 October 1861, Feldsberg – 27 January 1941, Vienna) was an Austrian zoologist. The son of a manufacturer, he studied at the Hochschule für Bodenkultur in Vienna and at the University of Leipzig. In 1886, he was awarded his doctorate. He became an assistant of Martin Wickens and in 1888 an assistant professor of zoology. From 1891 he was a professor in Krakau, from 1898 until 1932 he was the professor of animal product studies and the morphology of house pets at the Hochschule für Bodenkultur in Wien. He was a member of the Austrian Academy of Sciences.

Literary works 
 Allgemeine Tierzucht, 1926

References

External links 
 Aeiou.at 
 Adametz Leopold – WIEM, darmowa encyklopedia at portalwiedzy.onet.pl 
 Oeaw.ac.at 

1861 births
1941 deaths
People from Valtice
19th-century Austrian zoologists
Members of the Austrian Academy of Sciences
Members of the German Academy of Sciences Leopoldina
Academic staff of Jagiellonian University
Recipients of the Order of Polonia Restituta
20th-century Austrian zoologists